Pilea riopalenquensis is a species of plant in the family Urticaceae. It is endemic to Ecuador.  Its natural habitats are subtropical or tropical moist lowland forests and subtropical or tropical moist montane forests.

References

riopalenquensis
Endemic flora of Ecuador
Endangered plants
Taxonomy articles created by Polbot